Strongyloides (from Greek strongylos, round, + eidos, resemblance), anguillula, or threadworm is a genus of small nematode parasites, belonging to the family Strongylidae, commonly found in the small intestine of mammals (particularly ruminants), that are characterized by an unusual lifecycle that involves one or several generations of free-living adult worms.

Human infection, strongyloidiasis, is caused by

 Strongyloides stercoralis, widespread in all tropical regions
 Strongyloides fuelleborni, a parasite of primates in African and Asian tropics and of humans in African tropics and New Guinea
 Strongyloides papillosus, found in cattle, pigs, sheep, goats, rabbits, and rats
 Strongyloides ransomi, found in pigs
 Strongyloides ratti, found in rats
Strongyloides myopotami, found in coypu (nutria), causes dermatitis similar to strongyloidiasis. The condition is also called nutria itch.

Treatment for strongyloides infection is ivermectin or thiabendazole.

References 

Parasitic nematodes of mammals
Rhabditida genera
Strongylidae